Frédéric Holyszewski (Paris, 1970), also known as Dado and Deedrah is a French music producer mostly known his psytrance projects such as Deedrah, Transwave, Krome Angels and Synthetic.

Biography
He learned classical music since his childhood, playing piano and transverse flute, yet wanted to be a biology teacher. He got a masters in biology and geology (PARIS 6) but stopped his studies when he was 25 years old to produce the early Transwave tracks with fellow music producer Christophe Drouillet, aka Absolum.

He has been releasing his trance productions under the name Deedrah since 1995.

Collaborating with other people such as Sid Shanti, Bamboo Forest, and others, Dado has founded a broad and diverse spectrum of music in projects such as Transwave, Kaledoid, Synthetic, Cypher, The Digital Avengers, Dandandado, and The Good The Bad and the Ugly to name a few. He also heads another solo project with the name Federico Baltimore, with a more lounge/house style. He is known for having a high standard for his music productions and for his solid production quality. He is now living in Ibiza, producing music or touring the world. His newest projects are the fourth album of Transwave and the Krome Angels. Krome Angels is an EDM project, which includes Dino Psaras, Dado (Deedrah), and Shanti Matkin. Their debut album, Modern Day Classics, was released in February 2009 on the BOA Group label. Their second long-awaited album Sexy, Freaky, Nasty is due for release in April 2014.

Discography
Self Oscillation (Distance /Questionmark records) – His first voyage under the name Deedrah and a classic album defining his own solo sophisticated style.
Reload (Alien News) – an album veering towards the direction of melodic and progressive with a twist of psychedelia.
Body & Soul (spun rds) – A full-on psytrance album echoing from the days of Goa gatherings and beach parties.
Far and Away (Hadshot Haheizar)(released in June 2001).
Out Of Control (HOMmega Productions) (released in October 2012).

References

1970 births
Living people
French record producers